Antimicrobial peptide resistance and lipid A acylation protein PagP 
is a family of several bacterial antimicrobial peptide  resistance and lipid A acylation (PagP) proteins. The bacterial outer membrane enzyme PagP transfers a palmitate chain from a phospholipid to lipid A. In a number of pathogenic Gram-negative bacteria, PagP confers resistance to certain cationic antimicrobial peptides produced during the host innate immune response.

References 

Protein domains
Protein families
Outer membrane proteins